Frank "Frankie" Montecalvo (born December 28, 1990) is an American racing driver who currently competes in the WeatherTech SportsCar Championship.

Early life
A native of Highlands, New Jersey, Montecalvo attended high school at St. John Vianney High School.

Career
In 2012, Montecalvo took part in his first 24 Hours of Le Mans, driving for Luxury Racing in the GTE Am class. The team failed to finish the race, retiring with crash damage after 146 laps. Montecalvo returned to Le Mans in 2014, replacing Enzo Potolicchio in the 8 Star Motorsports GTE Am entry.  In 2015 Montecalvo won the GTA class of the Pirelli World Challenge. 

Prior to the 2019 WeatherTech SportsCar Championship season, Montecalvo joined AIM Vasser Sullivan in the GTD class, driving alongside Townsend Bell. Montecalvo scored his first IMSA victory in August 2020 at Road America. In 2023, Montecalvo returned for his fifth consecutive season with the team, and his second with Aaron Telitz as his co-driver.

Personal life
As of October 2020, Montecalvo is not a professional racing driver, working a day job at his family's recycling business.

Racing record

Complete American Le Mans Series results
(key) (Races in bold indicate pole position)

Complete WeatherTech SportsCar Championship results
(key) (Races in bold indicate pole position)

Complete 24 Hours of Le Mans results

References

External links
Official website of Frankie Montecalvo

1990 births
Living people
American racing drivers
24 Hours of Daytona drivers
WeatherTech SportsCar Championship drivers
American Le Mans Series drivers
24 Hours of Le Mans drivers
People from Highlands, New Jersey
Sportspeople from Monmouth County, New Jersey
St. John Vianney High School (New Jersey) alumni
DragonSpeed drivers